Rear-Admiral Richard Kempenfelt (1718 – 29 August 1782) was a British rear admiral who gained a reputation as a naval innovator. He is best known for his victory against the French at the Second Battle of Ushant and for his death when  accidentally sank at Portsmouth the following year.

Background
He was born at Westminster, the son of Magnus Kempenfelt and his wife Ann Hunt.  His father, a Swede, was a professional soldier in the British service.

Naval career
Richard Kempenfelt was commissioned a lieutenant in January 1741. He saw service in the West Indies, taking part in the capture of Portobelo during the War of Jenkins' Ear. In 1746 he returned to Britain, and from then until 1780, when he was made rear admiral, he saw active service in the East Indies with Sir George Pocock and in various quarters of the world.

In 1781 he won the Battle of Ushant, with a vastly inferior force, defeating the French fleet under Guichen and capturing 20 ships.

Royal George
In August this fleet was ordered to proceed to the relief of Gibraltar, and underwent a refit at top speed at Portsmouth.

On 29 August 1782, Royal George was being heeled off Portsmouth to allow repairs to be made to the water intake for the deck wash pump, which was three feet below water level. The larboard guns had been run out and the starboard guns moved into the centre of the deck to heel over the ship until her lowest gun ports were close to the surface of the water. A supply vessel, Lark, approached Royal George on her low side to transfer a cargo of rum. According to an Admiralty report – not made public until early the next century – the larboard cannons' weight on the ship's central frame caused excessively decayed timbers to break. This caused the ship to heel to such a degree that the sea washed in at her gunports, and she soon began to ship water in her hold. A sudden breeze on the raised side of the ship forced her further over and the water rushed in. The crew were ordered to right the ship but the fallen cannon could not be moved. Within a couple of minutes she rolled on to her side and sank before any distress signal could be given.

Nine hundred people were estimated to have lost their lives, for besides the crew there were a large number of tradesmen and women and children on board. About 230 people were saved, some by running up the rigging, while others were picked up by boats from other vessels. The usual assumption is that Kempenfelt was writing in his cabin when the ship sank; the cabin doors had jammed due to the ship heeling, and he perished with the rest. However, rival scenarios were reported at the time, as described in historian Hilary L. Rubinstein's book on the sinking, published in 2021. William Cowper's poem the "Loss of the Royal George" was based on the report that the admiral was trapped writing in his cabin, so that is the scenario which prevailed to the exclusion of other reports circulating at the time. Kempenfelt had effected radical alterations and improvements in the signalling system then existing in the British Navy. A painting of the loss of Royal George is in the Royal United Service Institution, London.

Kempenfelt took a great interest in evangelism. His hymns were published in Original Hymns and Poems by "Philotheorus" (Exeter, England: B. Thorn, 1777), dedicated to the Methodist John William Fletcher. It was reprinted in 1861 with a preface by Daniel Sedgwick.

Memorials

A memorial to Kempenfelt, by the sculptor John Bacon, was placed in the Chapel of St Michael Westminster Abbey in 1808.

Kempenfelt Bay on Lake Simcoe in Ontario, Canada, is named for him, and a number of warships have been named .

A 1768 painting of Kempenfelt, along with his fellow mariners Sir Samuel Cornish, 1st Baronet and Thomas Parry went on permanent display at Queen's House in Greenwich in Autumn 2022. The painting is by the artist Tilly Kettle and was purchased by the National Maritime Museum, with assistance from the Society for Nautical Research.

References

 
 Charnock's Biog. Nav., vi, 246, and Ralfe's Naval Biographies, i, 215, and Hilary L. Rubinstein, Catastrophe at Spithead: The Sinking of the Royal George 

1718 births
1782 deaths
Royal Navy admirals
Deaths due to shipwreck at sea
English hymnwriters
Accidental deaths in England
People from Westminster
English people of Swedish descent